Hazeldine may refer to:

 Hazeldine (band), an American alternative country band
 Hazledine and Company, an historical English ironworks

People with the surname
Alan Hazeldine (1948–2008), British pianist and conductor
Andrew Hazeldine (born 1994), British and New Zealand cricketer
Angela Hazeldine (born 1981), Welsh actress and musician
James Hazeldine (1947–2002), British actor
John Hazledine (1760–1810), English ironworker and engineer
Max Hazeldine (born 1997), English professional footballer
Sam Hazeldine (born 1972), English actor
Stuart Hazeldine (born 1971), British screenwriter, film producer and director

See also
 Hazeltine (disambiguation), a disambiguation page